Çüdülübinə (also, Chudulobina) is a village in the Zaqatala Rayon of Azerbaijan.  The village forms part of the municipality of Yuxarı Tala.

References

External links 

Populated places in Zaqatala District